Input lag or input latency is the amount of time that passes between sending an electrical signal and the occurrence of a corresponding action.

In video games the term is often used to describe any latency between an input and either the game or the display reacting to that input, despite the fact that this may emerge from a combination of input and output lag.

Potential causes of delay from pressing a button to the game reacting
The potential causes for "input lag"- according to the second definition- are described below (steps which have negligible contributions to the input lag have been omitted). Each step in the process increases "input lag", however the net result may be unnoticeable if the overall "input lag" is low enough.

Controller sends signal to console
For wired controllers, this lag is negligible. For wireless controllers, opinions vary as to the significance of this lag. Some people claim to notice extra lag when using a wireless controller, while other people claim that the 4–8 milliseconds of lag is negligible.

Console/PC processes next frame
A videogame console or PC will send out a new frame once it has finished performing the necessary calculations to create it. The amount of frames rendered per second (on average) is called the frame rate. The monitor is usually the bottleneck for the theoretical maximum FPS, since there is no point in rendering more frames than the monitor can display per second (unless trying to gain advantage on some pc titles). In situations where the CPU and/or GPU load is high, FPS can drop below the monitor's refresh rate.

Individual frames need not be finished within the interval of a screen refresh to output at an equivalent rate. Game engines often make use of pipelining architectures to process multiple frames concurrently, allowing for a more efficient use of the underlying hardware. This exacerbates input lag, especially at low frame rates.

Display lag

This is the lag caused by the television or monitor (which is also called "input lag" by the first definition above, but "output lag' by the second definition). Image processing (such as upscaling, motion smoothing, or edge smoothing) takes time and therefore adds some degree of input lag. An input lag below 30 ms is generally considered unnoticeable in a television. Once the frame has been processed, the final step is the updating the pixels to display the correct color for the new frame. The time this takes is called the pixel response time.

Typical overall response times 

See also 

 Response time (technology)

References
Input Lag Test: TVs from 2016 + 2017 Dein-Fernseher.de

Video hardware
Video game design